Sung Yi-chieh (born February 3, 1986) is a Taiwanese former swimmer, who specialized in sprint freestyle events. Sung qualified for the women's 100 m freestyle at the 2004 Summer Olympics, by clearing a FINA B-standard entry time of 58.08 from the National University Games in Taipei. She challenged seven other swimmers on the second heat, including three-time Olympian Agnese Ozoliņa of Latvia. She raced to fifth place by 0.15 of a second behind Ozolina in 59.85. Sung failed to advance into the semifinals, as she placed forty-fourth overall in the preliminaries.

References

1986 births
Living people
Olympic swimmers of Taiwan
Swimmers at the 2004 Summer Olympics
Taiwanese female freestyle swimmers